Bulbochaete is a genus of algae belonging to the family Oedogoniaceae.

The genus has almost cosmopolitan distribution.

Species:

Bulbochaete alabamensis 
Bulbochaete allorgei 
Bulbochaete angulosa

References

Oedogoniales
Chlorophyceae genera